Al-Furat Sports Club (Euphrates SC) is an Iraqi football club based in Suq al-Shuyukh, Dhi Qar. They currently play in the Iraq Division Two.

External links
 Al-Furat club's page on Goalzz.com

1965 establishments in Iraq
Football clubs in Dhi Qar